The list of hotels in Taiwan provides hotel names by city within Taiwan. The list mainly includes five and four star hotels and is not a directory of every hotel in the country.

By city

Taipei
 Caesar Metro Taipei
 Caesar Park Taipei
 Courtyard Taipei
 Grand Hotel (Taipei)
 Grand Hyatt Taipei
 Grand Mayfull Hotel Taipei
 Hotel Metropolitan Premier Taipei
 The Landis Taipei
 Le Méridien Taipei
 Mandarin Oriental, Taipei
 Marriott Taipei
 Regent Taipei
 Shangri-La Far Eastern, Taipei
 Sheraton Grand Taipei Hotel
 W Taipei

New Taipei
 Caesar Park Hotel Banqiao
 Hilton Taipei Sinban

Keelung
 Evergreen Laurel Hotel Keelung

Taoyuan
 Monarch Skyline Hotel
 Novotel Taipei Taoyuan International Airport
 Orchard Park Hotel (:zh:桃禧航空城酒店)
 Sheraton Taoyuan Hotel
 The Westin Tashee Resort

Hsinchu
 Ambassador Hotel Hsinchu
 Sheraton Hsinchu Hotel

Taichung
 Le Meridien Taichung
 Millennium Hotel Taichung
 National Hotel
 The Landis Taichung
 The Splendor Hotel Taichung
 Windsor Hotel Taichung

Tainan
 Evergreen Plaza Hotel (:zh:台糖長榮酒店)
 Gloria Prince Hotel (王子大飯店)
 Shangri-La's Far Eastern Plaza Hotel Tainan

Kaohsiung
 Ambassador Hotel Kaohsiung
 Grand Hi-Lai Hotel
 Han-Hsien International Hotel
 Hotel Nikko Kaohsiung
 Howard Plaza Hotel Kaohsiung
 InterContinental Kaohsiung
 Kaohsiung Grand Hotel
 Kaohsiung Marriott Hotel

Hengchun Township 

 Casa Ostia

Taitung
 Sheraton Taitung Hotel

Gallery

See also
 Lists of hotels – an index of hotel list articles on Wikipedia

 
Hotels
Taiwan